Baita railway station is a former passenger station of Jingbao Railway in Inner Mongolia. Currently, Baita is used primarily as a freight station. In 2014, the station was announced as a 'Key Cultural Relic' of Inner Mongolia. In 2019, this certification was upgraded to that of a Major Historical and Cultural Site Protected at the National Level.

The station name is derived from the nearby Baita pagoda.

See also
 List of stations on Jingbao railway

References

Railway stations in Inner Mongolia